The League Managers Association Awards is an annual award ceremony in English football, awarded by the League Managers Association. The most prestigious award is the LMA Manager of the Year award. It is presented to a manager from any division for his achievements in the prior season. The award is voted by fellow professional managers and as a result consideration is also given to managers who inherit poor sides or financial difficulties and not only those managers who do not have such financial constraints and have won trophies. On only five occasions has the Premier League winning manager won the award compared with the Premier League Manager of the Year award which has been won on all but four occasions by the manager of the team who were league champions. Trophies for the event are hand-crafted by silversmith Thomas Lyte, which also makes trophies for the LG Performance of the Week Award throughout the league season.

LMA Manager of the Year
The LMA Manager of the Year Award is voted by fellow managers and the winner can come from any of the four professional leagues. To date only six have come from outside the Premier League: 1996 winner Peter Reid, who led Sunderland to the Division One title; 1997 winner Danny Wilson, who guided Barnsley into the Premier League; 2000 winner Alan Curbishley who led Charlton to the Division One title; 2006 winner Steve Coppell, who led Reading to win the Championship; 2015 winner Eddie Howe, who guided AFC Bournemouth into the Premier League; and 2019 winner Chris Wilder, who took Sheffield United up from the Championship.

Breakdown of winners

Winners by individual

Winners by nationality

Divisional Award Winners

The divisional award winners are voted by a panel.

FA Cup Manager of the Year

Winners by individual
The following managers have won two or more awards.

Wins by country

Special Merit Award
Also referred to as Service to Football Award.

References

External links
League Managers Association

English football trophies and awards
Football managers in England
England
Annual events in England
Annual sporting events in the United Kingdom